Protounguicularia is a genus of fungi within the Hyaloscyphaceae family. The genus contains five species.

References

External links
Protounguicularia at Index Fungorum

Hyaloscyphaceae